Stickman Records is a Montreal-based Canadian house music record label of Premier Muzik International Corporation.

History
It began as a Toronto-based independent electronic music record label.

Compilations
Stickman - Musica (1996)

References

External links
Official website

Canadian independent record labels
Quebec record labels